Melbourne City Women Football Club is an Australian professional soccer club based in Bundoora, Melbourne. The club was formed in 2015. 

The list encompasses the honours won by Melbourne City Women. The player records section itemises the club's leading goalscorers and those who have made the most appearances in first-team competitions.

All figures are correct as of the match played on 22 March 2020.

Honours and achievements

W-League and Finals
 W-League Premiership
Winners (2): 2015–16, 2019–20

 W-League Championship
Winners (4): 2016, 2017, 2018, 2020

Player records

Appearances
 Most league appearances: Steph Catley and Rebekah Stott, 62
 Youngest first-team player: Lia Muldeary, 15 years, 112 days (against Newcastle Jets, W-League, 12 November 2017)
 Oldest first-team player: Melissa Barbieri, 37 years, 271 days (against Sydney FC, W-League, 18 November 2017)
 Most consecutive appearances: Lauren Barnes, 46 (from 8 January 2017 to 22 March 2020)

Most appearances
Competitive matches only, includes appearances as substitute. Numbers in brackets indicate goals scored.

Goalscorers
 Youngest goalscorer: Melina Ayres, 16 years, 188 days (against Sydney FC, W-League, 18 October 2015)
 Oldest goalscorer: Yukari Kinga, 35 years, 224 days (against Melbourne Victory, W-League, 12 December 2019)

Top goalscorers
Competitive matches only. Numbers in brackets indicate appearances made.

Managerial records

Club records

Matches

Firsts
 First match: Sydney FC 0–6 Melbourne City, W-League, 18 October 2015
 First home match at AAMI Park: Melbourne City 2–1 Melbourne Victory, W-League, 25 October 2015
 First home match at CB Smith Reserve: Melbourne City 2–0 Adelaide United, W-League, 14 November 2015

Record wins
 Record league win: 6–0 against Sydney FC, W-League, 18 October 2015

Record defeats
 Record league defeat: 
 1–4 against Perth Glory, W-League, 27 October 2017
 2–5 against Perth Glory, W-League, 25 November 2018

Record consecutive results
 Record consecutive wins: 18, from 18 October 2015 to 4 December 2016
 Record consecutive league wins: 18, from 18 October 2016 to 4 December 2016
 Record consecutive defeats: 3, from 10 December 2016 to 27 December 2016
 Record consecutive league defeats: 3, from 10 December 2016 to 27 December 2016
 Record consecutive matches without a defeat: 18, from 18 October 2015 to 4 December 2016
 Record consecutive league matches without a defeat: 18, from 18 October 2015 to 4 December 2016
 Record consecutive matches without a win: 6, from 10 December 2016 to 15 January 2017
 Record consecutive league matches without a win: 6, from 10 December 2016 to 15 January 2017

Goals
 Most league goals scored in a season: 38 in 12 matches, W-League, 2015–16
 Fewest league goals scored in a season: 19 in 12 matches, W-League, 2016–17
 Most league goals conceded in a season: 15
 in 12 matches, W-League, 2017–18
 in 12 matches, W-League, 2018–19
 Fewest league goals conceded in a season: 4
 in 12 matches, W-League, 2015–16
 in 12 matches, W-League, 2019–20

Points
 Most points in a season: 36 in 12 matches, W-League, 2015–16
 Fewest points in a season: 19 in 12 matches, W-League, 2018–19

References
General
 

Australian soccer club statistics